This is a list of the winners of the Bavarian Film Awards for Best Director.

Best Director

1981 Thomas Brasch, Wolfgang Petersen
1982 Percy Adlon
1983 Peter Schamoni
1984 Carl Schenkel
1985 Xaver Schwarzenberger
1987 Wim Wenders
1989 Uli Edel
1991 Percy Adlon, Michael Klier
1992 Helmut Dziuba, Juraj Herz
1993 Wim Wenders
1995 Rainer Kaufmann
1996 Helmut Dietl
1997 Joseph Vilsmaier, Sönke Wortmann
1998 Max Färberböck
1999 Rolf Schübel
2000 Oliver Hirschbiegel
2001 Peter Sehr
2002 Andreas Dresen
2003 Sönke Wortmann
2005 Andreas Dresen
2006 Tom Tykwer
2007 Fatih Akın
2008 Caroline Link
2009 Juraj Herz
2010 Tom Tykwer
2011 Doris Dörrie
2012 Michael Haneke
2013 Andreas Prochaska
2014 Baran bo Odar
2015 Kai Wessel
2016 Maren Ade, Nicolette Krebitz, Maria Schrader, Marie Noëlle, Franziska Meletzky
2017 Fatih Akin
2018 Caroline Link
2019 Sherry Hormann

Best Director (Low Budget)
1987 Hans Noever

Best New Director

1979 Dominik Graf
1980 Peter F. Bringmann
1985 Wolfram Paulus
1986 Peter Timm
1988 Nico Hoffmann
1988 Robert Sigl
1988 Maria Theresia Wagner
1989 Uwe Janson
1989 Berthold Mittermayr
1991 Detlev Buck
1991 Sherry Hormann
1993 Katja von Garnier
1994 Tom Tykwer
1996 Caroline Link
1998 Fatih Akın
1998 Marc Rothemund
1999 Veit Helmer
2000 Esther Gronenborn
2001 Zoltan Spirandelli
2002 Chris Kraus
2006 Marcus H. Rosenmüller
2007 Ralf Westhoff
2008 Jan Fehse
2010 Benjamin Heisenberg
2011 Sebastian Stern
2012 David Wnendt
2013 Michaela Kezele
2014 Katrin Gebbe
2015 Tomasz Emil Rudzik
2016 Uisenma Borchu
2017 Jakob M. Erwa
2018 Adrian Goiginger
2019 Kerstin Polte

References
https://www.stmd.bayern.de/wp-content/uploads/2020/08/Bayerische-Filmpreisträger-bis-2020.pdf

Awards for best director
Bavarian film awards